A Calamitous Elopement is a 1908 American silent short comedy film directed by D. W. Griffith. A print of the film is preserved in the film archive of the Library of Congress.

Plot
A young couple decides to elope after being caught in the midst of a romantic moment by the woman's angry father. They make plans to leave, but a thief discovers their plans and hides in their trunk and waits for the right moment to steal their belongings.

Cast
 Harry Solter as Frank
 Linda Arvidson as Jennie
 Charles Inslee as Jennie's Father
 George Gebhardt as Bill, a Thief
 John R. Cumpson
 D. W. Griffith as Policeman
 Robert Harron as Bellboy
 Florence Lawrence
 Anthony O'Sullivan

References

External links
 
A Calamitous Elopement available for free download at Internet Archive

1908 films
1908 comedy films
1908 short films
Silent American comedy films
American silent short films
American black-and-white films
Films directed by D. W. Griffith
American comedy short films
1900s American films